Heinrich Ludwig Julius Heppe (30 March 1820, Kassel, Hessen-Kassel – 25 July 1879, Marburg) was a German Calvinist theologian and church historian.

In 1844 he earned his doctorate from the University of Marburg, where he was a student of Orientalist Hermann Hupfeld (1796–1866). From 1845 he served as a pastor at St. Martin Church in Kassel. In 1850 he became an associate professor of theology at Marburg, where he attained full professorship in 1864.

Heppe specialized in the field of dogmatics, and excelled in the study of Hessian church history. At Marburg, he was a prime antagonist to the strict Confessional Lutheranism that was espoused by professor August Friedrich Christian Vilmar (1800–1868).

Written works

References 

  English translation

External links
 
 

1820 births
1879 deaths
German Calvinist and Reformed theologians
Academic staff of the University of Marburg
German historians of religion
Writers from Kassel
People from the Landgraviate of Hesse-Kassel
Reformation historians
19th-century Calvinist and Reformed theologians
19th-century German Protestant theologians
19th-century German male writers
German male non-fiction writers